Umaria railway station is a railway station in Umaria city of Umaria district in Madhya Pradesh. The station was built in 1886. The Tropic of Cancer passes at about 14.65 km to east. The station code of Umaria is 'UMR'. It has three platforms. It comes under Bilaspur railway division of South East Central Railway zone.

Trains

 Amarkantak Express
 Bilaspur–Rewa Express
 Betwa Express
 Durg–Nautanwa Express (via Sultanpur)
 Durg–Nautanwa Express (via Varanasi)
 Bhopal–Bilaspur Express
 Sarnath Express
 Kalinga Utkal Express
 Durg–Jammu Tawi Superfast Express
 Chhattisgarh Sampark Kranti Superfast Express
 Barauni–Gondia Express
 Narmada Express
 Durg–Ajmer Express
 Durg–Firozpur Cantonment Antyodaya Express
 Durg–Hazrat Nizamuddin Humsafar Express
 Madan Mahal–Ambikapur Intercity Express
 Bhopal–Chirimiri Express
 Hirakud Express

References

Railway stations in Umaria district
Bilaspur railway division
Umaria